The Tub is a pastel artwork by Edgar Degas (1834–1917), painted in 1886, and housed in the Musée d'Orsay in Paris. A masterwork of Degas, it skillfully combines still life of toilet articles with a distorted perspective and plunging view, make this pastel one of the most audacious and accomplished of Degas' works.

References 

Pastel drawings by Edgar Degas
Paintings of people
Bathing in art